Cambern Dutch Shop Windmill is a historic commercial building constructed in the shape of a windmill at 1102 S. Perry in Spokane, Washington, United States.  It was built in 1929 and added to the National Register of Historic Places in 1989.

The building is located in the South Perry District of the East Central neighborhood. It is located along Perry Street in a commercial district which serves the immediate and wider neighborhoods. As of 2022 the building is home to Lorien Herbs and Natural Foods.

See also  
 Windmill Quaker State: On the NRHP in West Virginia

References

External links
 Photo and information

Buildings and structures in Spokane, Washington
Commercial buildings on the National Register of Historic Places in Washington (state)
National Register of Historic Places in Spokane, Washington
Windmills completed in 1929
Novelty buildings in Washington (state)
Commercial buildings completed in 1929
1929 establishments in Washington (state)
Windmills on the National Register of Historic Places